Southwest District School may refer to:

Southwest District School (Bloomfield, Connecticut), listed on the National Register of Historic Places in Hartford County, Connecticut
Southwest District School (Wolcott, Connecticut), listed on the National Register of Historic Places in New Haven County, Connecticut